Anthony J Chivers (born 30 November 1936) is a British former international sports shooter. He competed in the 50 metre pistol event at the 1964 Summer Olympics.

He also represented England in the 50 metres free pistol event, at the 1966 British Empire and Commonwealth Games in Kingston, Jamaica.

References

1936 births
Living people
British male sport shooters
Olympic shooters of Great Britain
Shooters at the 1964 Summer Olympics
People from Marylebone
Sportspeople from London
Shooters at the 1966 British Empire and Commonwealth Games
Commonwealth Games competitors for England
20th-century British people